Haft Dasht-e Olya (also Romanized as Haft Dasht-e ‘Olyā; also known as Haft Dasht-e Bālā) is a village in Mahur Rural District, Mahvarmilani District, Mamasani County, Fars Province, Iran. At the 2006 census, its population was 45, in 10 families.

References 

Populated places in Mamasani County